Louis Sherry Inc. was an early 20th-century company known for quality confectionery products, particularly candy and ice cream.  It was founded by New York  restaurateur Louis Sherry and Lucius M. Boomer, then Chairman of the Waldorf-Astoria Hotel.  The company was acquired by the Childs Company in 1950, for "more than $2,000,000".

References

Defunct companies based in New York (state)
Childs Restaurants